Alexander Leslie-Melville may refer to:

Alexander Leslie-Melville, 7th Earl of Leven (1749–1820), Scottish Whig politician
Alexander Leslie-Melville, 10th Earl of Leven (1817–1889)
Alexander Leslie-Melville, 14th Earl of Leven (1924–2012), Scottish peer and soldier
Alexander Leslie-Melville, Lord Balgonie (1831–1857), British soldier

See also
Alexander Leslie (disambiguation)
Alexander Melville (disambiguation)